Kathetostoma canaster, the speckled stargazer, is a fish species described in 1987.

References 

Uranoscopidae
Fish described in 1987
Fish of Australia